Bangladesh Police Liberation War Museum is a museum that commemorates the contribution of Bangladesh Police to the Bangladesh Liberation War. It is located at Rajarbagh Police Lines on 1.5 bighas of (216,000 sq ft) land area and was established on 24 March 2013. It contains various materials and symbols which denote the sacrifice of police soldiers during the war. The museum's research unit identified a police officer killed in British Council premises during the Bangladesh Liberation war. Habibur Rahman is the founder and President of Bangladesh Police Liberation War Museum

Background history
The liberation war of Bangladesh took place in 1971. On 25 March 1971, the Pakistani military attacked Rajarbagh police lines. The Bangalee police, attacked unexpectedly, armed themselves with rifles and whatever else they could find. Most of the police were killed by the Pakistani army. After about 42 years of their martyrdom, the government took steps to hold their memory. The museum was inaugurated by the prime minister Sheikh Hasina, on the telecom building in Rajarbagh Police Lines on 24 March 2013.

References

See more 
 Bangladesh Police
 Bangladesh Liberation War
 Liberation War Museum

External links 
 Official Website
 Museum Facebook page 

Museums established in 2013
Museums in Dhaka
History museums in Bangladesh
2013 establishments in Bangladesh
Aftermath of the Bangladesh Liberation War
Law enforcement museums in Asia
Bangladesh Police